Potassium channel, subfamily U, member 1, also known as KCNU1, is a gene encoding the KCa5.1 protein.

Although this channel is structurally related to the calcium-activated potassium channels, it cannot be classified as such since it is activated by high intracellular pH and relatively insensitive to changes in calcium concentrations.

References

Celia M. Santi, Alice Butler, Julia Kuhn, Aguan Wei, Lawrence Salkoff. Bovine and mouse SLO3 K+ channels: Evolutionary divergence points to a RCK1 region of critical function. J Biol Chem.284: 21589-98 (2009).

External links

Further reading

Celia M. Santi, Alice Butler, Julia Kuhn, Aguan Wei, Lawrence Salkoff.  Bovine and mouse SLO3 K+ channels: Evolutionary divergence points to a RCK1 region of critical function.  J Biol Chem.284: 21589-98 (2009).